Samo Šalamon (born October 9, 1978 in Maribor, Slovenia) is a Slovenian jazz composer, guitarist, and bandleader. He has performed on over 35 releases and is credited with over 140 compositions.

Biography 
Salamon started playing the guitar at the age of 7 and studied classical guitar in Maribor, Slovenia until the age of 15. He continued his studies at the University of Ljubljana, where he obtained a PhD in the field of American poetry and translation. During his time at college, he became interested in jazz and improvisation. 

Salamon met jazz guitarist John Scofield in 1999, and Scofield became a mentor to Salamon. Salamon became obsessed with practicing and maintained a practice schedule of five to six hours per day for a couple of years. In the early 2000s, he started to play and record with musicians from the New York jazz scene, including Tim Berne, David Binney, Josh Roseman, Tony Malaby, Mark Helias, Tom Rainey, Gerald Cleaver, Tyshawn Sorey, John Hebert, Donny McCaslin and others. In 2003 he recorded his debut as a bandleader entitled Ornethology featuring a European quartet with Achille Succi, Salvatore Maiore and Zlatko Kaučič. With this group he performed at Ljubljana Jazz Festival, Roma Jazz Festival and Skopje Jazz Festival The album Ornethology was also selected among the 1001 best albums in the history of jazz according to the Penguin Guide to Jazz.

Salamon regularly toured Europe 2-3 times per year, where his groups included various European and American jazz musicians, especially maintaining long musical relationships with French tubist Michel Godard, American reedist and founding member of the group Oregon Paul McCandless, saxophonists Achille Succi and Tony Malaby, drummer Roberto Dani and pianist Stefano Battaglia. In later period he has regularly mixed modern composition and improvisation, as seen in his latest projects, such as duos with guitarist Hasse Poulsen and clarinetist Francois Houle, his European sextet for Clean Feed Records – The Colors Suite featuring Julian Arguelles, Achille Succi, Pascal Niggenkemper and two drummers, Christian Lillinger and Roberto Dani, as well as a large free orchestra, composed of European improvisers, including Fredrik Ljungkvist, Luis Vicente, Albert Cirera, Martin Küchen and others.

He has recorded for European jazz labels like Clean Feed Records, Fresh Sound New Talent, Not Two Records, Steeplechase Records, Splasc(h) Records and others. As a composer he has developed projects with multiform syntheses of contemporary jazz, classical music and free improvisation.

Salamon has been involved in playing Eric Dolphy's music on solo acoustic guitar, which resulted in the album Dolphyology. The album features all 28 compositions by Eric Dolphy, rearranged for acoustic guitar, venturing from avantgarde excursions to  highly lyrical moments.

In June 2022, Salamon released a trio album Pure and Simple with the jazz legends - Norwegian bassist Arild Andersen and US drummer Ra-Kalam Bob Moses, followed by an extensive European tour in October 2022.

Style 
Salamon's fluid style of guitar playing is primarily based on his studies of jazz saxophonists Ornette Coleman and Eric Dolphy, mostly visible on his first two albums Ornethology and Ela's Dream, where his playing has been described as having a "quirky yet intriguing original sound". His early guitar playing is influenced by guitarist and mentor John Scofield, while also drawing inspiration from players like John Abercrombie, Ben Monder, Adam Rogers and Bill Frisell. His compositional style draws from different areas of jazz as well as modern classical composers, such as Bela Bartok, Witold Lutoslawski and Olivier Messiaen.

Discography

References

External links 

 
 
 

1978 births
Musicians from Maribor
Slovenian male musicians
Slovenian guitarists
Slovenian jazz composers
21st-century jazz composers
Male jazz composers
University of Ljubljana alumni
Living people